Verkhne-Gnilovskoye Cemetery ("Upper Gnilovskoy cemetery") is a cemetery in Rostov-on-Don, Russia. In 2015, areas of the cemetery were described as "impassible thickets".

History 
The cemetery is located in the Zheleznodorozhniy district of Rostov-on-Don. The territory of the cemetery is limited with three streets – Portovaya, Kulagina and Meydunarodnaya. Total area is 4.5 hectares. Burials have been made here since the 19th century. It was in force till 1972, when the Northern cemetery was opened. For many years burials were forbidden. In 1998, when the Northern cemetery had problems with new places, sub-burials in related graves were resumed.

During the war, warriors who were killed in the battle for Rostov's liberation were buried in mass graves. A monument was created to their memory.  A monument to pilots who died in a helicopter crash “Mi-6” was created in the main alley in 1969.

Famous people buried in the cemetery 
Vladimir Semenovich Shcherbakov (1891–1967), a machinist on the Russian cruiser Aurora, was buried in Upper-Gnilovsky cemetery.

Jenya Repko, young Rostov hero of The Great Patriotic war, was buried there too.

References

External links
 
 

Cemeteries in Rostov-on-Don